Bel Air High School is a high school in the city of El Paso, Texas, United States.  The school was established in 1957. It houses Bel Air Middle School, with transfers from Eastwood as well as other
local middle schools. Its Health Professions Branch offers the most transfers, closely followed by the Global Enterprises program.

Bel Air High School placed 984th on Newsweeks list of the nation's top high schools based on rankings influenced heavily by the number of students who took Advanced Placement tests the previous year. In 2013 Texas UIL changed the areas from 4A-5A to a 5A-6A divisions causing Bel Air High School to remain behind in the 5A division due to the lack of student population.

Engineering

During freshman year, all students  take Concepts of Engineering and Technology.

In sophomore year, they are separated into three smaller divisions, entering into Engineering Design and Presentation, Principles of Engineering (PTLW), or Principles of Architectures and Construction.

In junior year, they gain the second level of their previous choice, which are Robotics and Automation, Digital Electronics, and Architectural Design.

In senior year, they develop into two pathways, Engineering Design and Development, and Advanced Interior Design.

Alumni
Bel Air Highlander Alumni is the alumni association.

Parent organization
The Bel Air Highland Clan is the parent organization.

Sports

On April 20, 2019 the Bel Air High School Boys soccer team won the 5A state championship. It was the Highlanders first ever state championship in soccer. It was one of two state championships that the city of El Paso, TX claimed that day. The San Eli High School boys soccer team also won their perspective division. The Highlanders first made school history in the 2019 season by advancing to the final four for the first time. To win the state championship, the highlanders knocked off the two time defending state champions Frisco Wakeland. The game was won by a second half goal scored by the Highlander's Ivar Arroyo who was later named the MVP of the match.

References

External links
 Bel Air High School website

Ysleta Independent School District high schools
Educational institutions established in 1957
High schools in El Paso, Texas
1957 establishments in Texas